Diethylene glycol diethyl ether is an organic solvent with a high boiling point.

Glycol ethers